The Bromley Council election of 2002 took place on 2 May, coinciding with 174 other council elections across Britain. The election saw the Conservatives make sweeping gains after losing power in 1998 to a Liberal-Labour coalition.

Election Summary

|}

Ward results

References

2002
2002 London Borough council elections